The Mumm rearrangement is an organic reaction and a rearrangement reaction. It describes a 1,3(O-N) acyl transfer of an acyl imidate or isoimide group to an imide.

The reaction is of relevance as part of the Ugi reaction.

References

Rearrangement reactions
Name reactions
Carboximidates